WWWOFFLE is a proxy server and web caching software, allowing dial-up or broadband users to cache data for offline use. It can handle HTTP, FTP, and finger protocol, and operates on IPv4 and IPv6. Version builds are Unix-based: ports are available for Linux, and Win32 support is provided via Cygwin.

References

External links

Free proxy servers
Unix network-related software